Chile competed at the 2002 Winter Paralympics in Salt Lake City, United States. 2 competitors from Chile won no medals and so did not place in the medal table.

See also 
 Chile at the Paralympics
 Chile at the 2002 Winter Olympics

References 

2002
2002 in Chilean sport
Nations at the 2002 Winter Paralympics